Warn That Man is a 1943 British comedy thriller film directed by Lawrence Huntington and starring Gordon Harker, Raymond Lovell and Finlay Currie.

It was based on the 1941 play Warn That Man! by Vernon Sylvaine which had run for ten months on the West End stage, with Harker reprising his original role. The film was made at Welwyn Studios, with sets designed by the art director Charles Gilbert.

The plot is noted for the similarity of the later The Eagle Has Landed which also concerns a plot to kidnap Winston Churchill from rural England.

Premise
At a country house during the Second World War, a German actor, who looks uncannily like a British peer, takes his place as part of a German attempt to kidnap the Prime Minister, Winston Churchill, when he visits the estate. Unfortunately for their plans, the niece of the peer arrives unannounced, along with her RAF pilot fiance, and two of his new friends, who had rescued him at sea when he was shot down.

Cast

 Gordon Harker as George Hawkins
 Raymond Lovell as Hausemann / Lord Buckley
 Finlay Currie as Captain Andrew Fletcher
 Philip Friend as John Cooper
 Jean Kent as Frances Lane
 Frederick Cooper as Charles / Frampton
 Carl Jaffe as Schultz
 John Salew as Wilson
 Veronica Rose as Miss Conway
 Anthony Hawtrey as Brent
 Anthony Holles as Waiter
 Patrick Aherne as Mellows
 Frank Bagnall as Lehmann  
 Ferdy Mayne as German Radio Operator  
 Friedrich Richter as Wolheim  
 Leonard Sharp as Miles

References

Bibliography
 Fox, Jo. Film Propaganda in Britain and Nazi Germany: World War II Cinema. Bloomsbury Academic, 2007.

External links

1943 films
1940s comedy thriller films
Films directed by Lawrence Huntington
Films shot at Welwyn Studios
Films set in England
Films set in London
British films based on plays
British black-and-white films
British comedy thriller films
1943 comedy films
1940s English-language films
1940s British films